The 2021 Shelbourne F.C. season was the club's 126th season in existence and their first back in the League of Ireland First Division following relegation from the League of Ireland Premier Division at the end of 2020. Shelbourne won the First Division title and promotion to the Premier Division following a 1–0 win over Treaty United on 1 October 2021. Shelbourne competed in the FAI Cup, but the League of Ireland Cup was cancelled due to the Coronavirus pandemic.

Overview

Shelbourne began the 2021 season with a 0–0 draw away to Galway United; Georgie Poynton, Sean Quinn and Ryan Brennan were the only surviving members of the 2020 squad in the starting eleven, with ex-Cork City defender Kevin O'Connor standing in as captain. New signing Glen McAuley received a red card in the 41st minute for a dangerous challenge on Maurice Nugent in a game which saw 9 players make their Shels debuts. Following a 3–3 draw with Bray Wanderers, Shels picked up their first win of the season at home to Wexford, an own goal by Conor Crowley settling the tie. Shelbourne won 11 out of the next 14 games and club captain Luke Byrne returned to the starting line up for the 1–0 win at home to Athlone Town on 7 May 2021. The Reds topped the league table the following week after their 2–1 win away to Cobh Ramblers, and stayed there unopposed for the rest of the season.

Fans returned to Tolka Park for the first time since the start of the COVID-19 pandemic on 25 June 2021, with 100 supporters allowed in for the visit of Cork City. The 2–1 win gave Shelbourne an 11-point lead at the top of the league table. Sean Quinn and Glen McAuley departed the club in July, while Eric Molloy, Kameron Ledwidge and Yassine En-Neyah arrived as Shelbourne looked to strengthen their squad ahead of the final ten games. Molloy made his debut as a substitute as Shels exited the FAI Cup in the first round via a 0–2 defeat away to UCD Due to squad absences a much changed team lined up against UCD in the league on 7 August 2021, with Under-19's goalkeeper Jack McCarthy making his debut and keeping a clean sheet after Brendan Clark and Jack Brady were unavailable for selection. Shelbourne suffered their first defeat of the season away to Galway United the following week, but would only lose one other game during the reminder of the season.

The next four games saw Shelbourne draw at home to Bray Wanderers, win at home against Wexford, and win away to Cobh and Cabinteely. A win at home to Treaty United on 1 October 2021 would see Shelbourne secure promotion, and Georgie Poynton's 74th minute spot kick secured the 1–0 victory. At the final whistle fans burst onto the Tolka Park pitch to celebrate the return to the Premier Division with players and staff. The next two games saw a 1–1 draw at home to Athlone Town and a 0–2 defeat away to Cobh.

Manager Ian Morris announced his departure from the managers position on 25 October 2021, effective the end of the season. The final game of the season saw UCD visit Tolka Park on 29 October 2021. Despite early pressure from Shelbourne, UCD went ahead through Evan Caffrey early in the second half. Ex-UCD striker Yoyo Mahdy replaced Brian McManus late on and scored an equaliser in the 88th minute to preserve Shels unbeaten home record for the 2021 season. Following the final whistle fans were invited onto the pitch to see the team presented with the First Division Trophy.

Damien Duff was announced as manager for the 2022 season on 3 November 2021.

First team squad

 Players' ages are as of the opening day of the 2021 season.

Coaching staff

Transfers

Transfers in

Transfers out

Loans out

Competitions

Overview

League of Ireland

Results summary

Results by matchday

Matches

FAI Cup

Matches

Statistics

Appearances and goals
As of match played 29 October 2021. Substitute appearances in brackets.

 Players listed in italics left the club mid-season
Source: Extratime.com

Goalscorers 
As of match played 29 October 2021.

Players listed in italics left the club mid-season
Source: Extratime.com

Discipline 
As of match played 29 October 2021.

 Players listed in italics left the club mid-season.
 Source: Extratime.com

Kit

|
|
|}

New Home & Away kits were released for the 2021 season.

Key:
H = Home
A = Away
LOI = League of Ireland Premier Division
FAIC = FAI Cup

Awards 

 Player of the Year: Ryan Brennan
 Young Player of the Year: Shane Farrell

References

External links

 
2021 in Republic of Ireland association football
Shelbourne F.C. seasons
Shelbourne